Bimbo, or formerly Trio Bimbo, is an Indonesian religious vocal group.

History
The group was named Trio Bimbo by Hamid Gruno of TVRI. The trio performed Consuelo Velazquez's "Besame Mucho" and Elpido Ramirez's "Malaguenna Salerosa".

In 1969, Trio Bimbo submitted to Remaco several songs written by Iwan Abdurahman, including "Melati dari Jayagiri" ("Jasmine from Jayagiri") and "Flamboyan" ("Flamboyant"). One year later, Trio Bimbo released its debut album recorded by Polydor. The album consists of Iwan Abdurahman and Tonny Koeswoyo tunes, namely "Pinang Muda", "Melati dari Jayagiri", "Berpisah", "Flamboyan", "Manis dan Sayang", and "Pengembara". The album also includes international hits such as "Light My Fire", "Once There Was A Love", "Cecilia, El Condor Pasa" and "I Have Dreamed" and "Wichita Lineman".  Trio Bimbo was helped by Maryono, a saxophonist from Surabaya. In Indonesia, the album was distributed by Remaco.

In the early 1970s, Remaco decided to release Trio Bimbo's album. The songs of the album including Iwan Abdurahman's "Balada Seorang Kelana" and "Angin November", "Sunyi" by A. Riyanto, and "Bunga Sedap Malam" by Koeswandi. Trio Bimbo changed its name to Bimbo in 1973, following Lin's joining the group. In this period, Bimbo added Indra Rivai on keyboards, Iwan Abdurrachman on bass guitar and Rudy Suparma on drums.

Style

Music
Bimbo employed unique vocal harmonies. The members said that Queen influenced their vocal harmonies. One of Bimbo's songs "Di Atas Jembatan Semanggi" has a similar verse to "Bohemian Rhapsody". Rolling Stone Indonesia described Bimbo as a heavy melodic structure with wider chords. Bimbo often adopts minor keys. Asrat Ginting wrote that Bimbo uses various kind of music, from qasidah to pop, while Indonesian litterateur Ramadhan K.H. described Bimbo's music as "Mozart's music and infiltrates to the heart like Ciganjuran".

Lyrics
Ginting writes that Bimbo preferred poetic lyrics. He also described Bimbo's works as "full of depth and contemplative". Bimbo performed several poems including Wing Kardjo's "Kutulis Lagi" and "Salju", Taufiq Ismail's "Oda pada Van Gogh" and "Dengan Puisi", and Ramadhan K.H.'s "Kehadiran". In the mid-1970s, however, Bimbo used social criticism, humor and satirical lyrics. In "Tante Sun" to satirize state official wives who abuse the authority

In the 1980s, Bimbo's lyrics were more directed to international events. "Surat Untuk Reagan dan Brezhnev" criticizes the Cold War, "Antara Kabul dan Beirut" tells about conflict in the Middle East, "Balada Tuan Hue Hue" is about Vietnamese refugees and "Elegi Buat PBB", is addressed to the United Nations.

In 2007, Bimbo released an album as a marker to its 40th anniversary. Bimbo collaborated to Taufiq Ismail in this album. One of the songs is "Jual Beli".

Notes

References
Footnotes

Bibliography

Musical groups established in 1967
Musical groups from Bandung
1967 establishments in Indonesia